Melite or Melita (Ancient Greek: Μελίτη Melitê means 'calm, honey sweet' or 'glorious, splendid') was the name of several characters in Greek mythology:

 Melita, one of the 3,000 Oceanids, water-nymph daughters of the Titans Oceanus and his sister-spouse Tethys. She was one of the companions of Persephone along with her sisters when the daughter of Demeter was abducted by Hades.
 Melite or Melie, the "gracious" Nereid of the calm seas. She was a sea-nymph daughter of the "Old Man of the Sea" Nereus and the Oceanid Doris. Melite and her other sisters appear to Thetis when she cries out in sympathy for the grief of Achilles at the slaying of his friend Patroclus. Later on, together with her sisters Thaleia, Speio, Cymodoce, Nesaea, Panopea and Thetis, they were able to help the hero Aeneas and his crew during a storm.
Melite, naiad daughter of the river god Aegaeus and mother of Hyllus by Heracles.
 Melite, one of the Erasinides, four naiad daughters of the Argive river-god Erasinus. Together with her sisters, Anchiroe, Byze and Maera, they became the followers of Britomartis.
Melite, an Egyptian princess as the daughter of King Busiris and possible sister of Amphidamas. She was the mother of Metus by Poseidon.
 Melite or Meta, daughter of Hoples and the first wife of Aegeus.
Melite, eponym of a deme in Attica.
 Melite, one of the sacrificial victims of Minotaur and daughter of Tricorythus/ Tricolonus/ Triagonus.

Notes

References 

 Antoninus Liberalis, The Metamorphoses of Antoninus Liberalis translated by Francis Celoria (Routledge 1992). Online version at the Topos Text Project.
 Apollodorus, The Library with an English Translation by Sir James George Frazer, F.B.A., F.R.S. in 2 Volumes, Cambridge, MA, Harvard University Press; London, William Heinemann Ltd. 1921. ISBN 0-674-99135-4. Online version at the Perseus Digital Library. Greek text available from the same website.
 Apollonius Rhodius, Argonautica translated by Robert Cooper Seaton (1853-1915), R. C. Loeb Classical Library Volume 001. London, William Heinemann Ltd, 1912. Online version at the Topos Text Project.
 Apollonius Rhodius, Argonautica. George W. Mooney. London. Longmans, Green. 1912. Greek text available at the Perseus Digital Library.
 Gaius Julius Hyginus, Fabulae from The Myths of Hyginus translated and edited by Mary Grant. University of Kansas Publications in Humanistic Studies. Online version at the Topos Text Project.
 Hesiod, Theogony from The Homeric Hymns and Homerica with an English Translation by Hugh G. Evelyn-White, Cambridge, MA.,Harvard University Press; London, William Heinemann Ltd. 1914. Online version at the Perseus Digital Library. Greek text available from the same website.
 Homer, The Iliad with an English Translation by A.T. Murray, Ph.D. in two volumes. Cambridge, MA., Harvard University Press; London, William Heinemann, Ltd. 1924. . Online version at the Perseus Digital Library.
 Homer, Homeri Opera in five volumes. Oxford, Oxford University Press. 1920. . Greek text available at the Perseus Digital Library.
 The Homeric Hymns and Homerica with an English Translation by Hugh G. Evelyn-White. Homeric Hymns. Cambridge, MA.,Harvard University Press; London, William Heinemann Ltd. 1914. Online version at the Perseus Digital Library. Greek text available from the same website.
Kerényi, Carl, The Gods of the Greeks, Thames and Hudson, London, 1951.
Maurus Servius Honoratus, In Vergilii carmina comentarii. Servii Grammatici qui feruntur in Vergilii carmina commentarii; recensuerunt Georgius Thilo et Hermannus Hagen. Georgius Thilo. Leipzig. B. G. Teubner. 1881. Online version at the Perseus Digital Library.
Publius Vergilius Maro, Aeneid. Theodore C. Williams. trans. Boston. Houghton Mifflin Co. 1910. Online version at the Perseus Digital Library.
Publius Vergilius Maro, Bucolics, Aeneid, and Georgics. J. B. Greenough. Boston. Ginn & Co. 1900. Latin text available at the Perseus Digital Library.

Oceanids
Nereids
Children of Potamoi
Deities in the Iliad
Deities in the Aeneid